The Quai d'Orsay is a quay in the 7th arrondissement of Paris. It is part of the left bank of the Seine opposite the Place de la Concorde. The Quai becomes the Quai Anatole-France east of the Palais Bourbon, and the Quai Branly west of the Pont de l'Alma.

History
The Quai (rue du Bac) has historically played an important role in French art as a location to which many artists came to paint along the banks of the river Seine. Construction of the wharf proceeded slowly.

The French Ministry of Foreign Affairs is located on the Quai d'Orsay, between the Esplanade des Invalides and the National Assembly at the Palais Bourbon, and thus the ministry is often called the Quai d'Orsay by metonymy. The building containing the Ministry of Foreign Affairs was built between 1844 and 1855 by Jacques Lacornée. The statues of the facade were created by the sculptor Henri de Triqueti (1870). The Treaty of Versailles (1919) was negotiated and written at the Ministry of Foreign Affairs.

The American Church in Paris, located at 65 Quai d'Orsay, was built in 1931.

Name's origin
The Quai d'Orsay is named after Charles Boucher, Lord of Orsay, who was appointed administrator of commerce for the city of Paris from 1700 to 1708. 

Orsay is a town 21 km south of the centre of Paris.

Gallery

References

External links
Official web site of the Ministry building
Musée d'Orsay: History of the site 

Orsay, Quai d'
Buildings and structures in the 7th arrondissement of Paris